Þórunn Arna Kristjánsdóttir (born 1983) is an Icelandic actress and singer. A prominent stage actress, she appeared as Sophie in  Reykjavík City Theatre performance of the Mamma Mia! musical.  In 2014, she appeared in the TV show Ævar vísindamaður and in 2021, she appeared as a fictional version of herself in the comedy series Vegferð.

Early life
Þórunn was born and raised in Ísafjörður where she attended Menntaskólinn á Ísafirði. In 2006, she graduated from the Iceland University of the Arts.

Filmography

References

External links
 

Living people
1983 births
Þórunn Arna Kristjánsdóttir
Þórunn Arna Kristjánsdóttir
Þórunn Arna Kristjánsdóttir
Þórunn Arna Kristjánsdóttir
Þórunn Arna Kristjánsdóttir